Hollywood was an unincorporated community and coal town which was ultimately incorporated into the boundaries of Hazleton, Pennsylvania, United States.

Notable person
Sarah Knauss (1880–1999), a supercentenarian who lived to be 119 years old. She died in Allentown.

References

Company towns in Pennsylvania
Geography of Luzerne County, Pennsylvania
Coal towns in Pennsylvania